In seven-dimensional geometry, a cantellated 7-orthoplex is a convex uniform 7-polytope, being a cantellation of the regular 7-orthoplex.

There are ten degrees of cantellation for the 7-orthoplex, including truncations. Six are most simply constructible from the dual 7-cube.

Cantellated 7-orthoplex

Alternate names
 Small rhombated hecatonicosoctaexon (acronym: sarz) (Jonathan Bowers)

Images

Bicantellated 7-orthoplex

Alternate names
 Small birhombated hecatonicosoctaexon (acronym: sebraz) (Jonathan Bowers)

Images

Cantitruncated 7-orthoplex

Alternate names
 Great rhombated hecatonicosoctaexon (acronym: garz) (Jonathan Bowers)

Images

Bicantitruncated 7-orthoplex

Alternate names
 Great birhombated hecatonicosoctaexon (acronym: gebraz) (Jonathan Bowers)

Images

Related polytopes 
These polytopes are from a family of 127 uniform 7-polytopes with B7 symmetry.

See also
 List of B7 polytopes

Notes

References
 H.S.M. Coxeter:
 H.S.M. Coxeter, Regular Polytopes, 3rd Edition, Dover New York, 1973
 Kaleidoscopes: Selected Writings of H.S.M. Coxeter, edited by F. Arthur Sherk, Peter McMullen, Anthony C. Thompson, Asia Ivic Weiss, Wiley-Interscience Publication, 1995,  
 (Paper 22) H.S.M. Coxeter, Regular and Semi Regular Polytopes I, [Math. Zeit. 46 (1940) 380-407, MR 2,10]
 (Paper 23) H.S.M. Coxeter, Regular and Semi-Regular Polytopes II, [Math. Zeit. 188 (1985) 559-591]
 (Paper 24) H.S.M. Coxeter, Regular and Semi-Regular Polytopes III, [Math. Zeit. 200 (1988) 3-45]
 Norman Johnson Uniform Polytopes, Manuscript (1991)
 N.W. Johnson: The Theory of Uniform Polytopes and Honeycombs, Ph.D. 1966
  - o3o3o3o3x3o4x - sarz, o3o3o3x3o3x4o - sebraz, o3o3o3o3x3x4x - garz, o3o3o3x3x3x4o - gebraz

External links 
 Polytopes of Various Dimensions
 Multi-dimensional Glossary

7-polytopes